Shootin' Straight is a live album by the American musician Dan Hicks, released in 1994. Hicks was backed by the Acoustic Warriors. It was Hicks's first major album since 1978.

Production
Produced by Joel Moss, the album was recorded over two nights at McCabe's Guitar Shop, in Santa Monica, California. Hicks had been playing McCabe's for more than 12 years. Shootin' Straight is made up of previously unrecorded songs.

Bette Midler and Asleep at the Wheel had covered Hicks's "Up! Up! Up!"

Critical reception

The Washington Post wrote that the album "proves that his off-beat sense of humor and his dead-on sense of swing are intact ... Hicks sings about barflies, bank robbers and flying-saucer pilots in a small, dry voice that drifts easily over the crisp swing below." The Knoxville News Sentinel noted that "Hicks sounds charmingly confused in his stage patter."

The Indianapolis Star called the album full of "quirky humor and acoustic tunes that draw on influences ranging from jazz accordion to Texas swing slide guitar." The Los Angeles Times thought that "the zesty interplay of guitars, fiddles and mandolins looks back to Django Reinhardt." The Commercial Appeal stated: "Instrumentally, this is a group to reckon with, as Paul Robinson's lightning lead acoustic guitar intertwines with Stevie Blacke's mandolin and Jim Boggio provides atmospheric accordion."

AllMusic wrote that "the material owes a lot to pre-bebop jazz, but it also owes a lot to country, rock, folk, and blues." Elijah Wald, of The Boston Globe, listed it as one of 1994's best albums.

Track listing

References

1994 live albums